Odostomia bulimulus is a species of sea snail, a marine gastropod mollusc in the family Pyramidellidae, the pyrams and their allies.

Description
The shell grows to a length of 5 mm. The thin shell is smooth and shining. There are six slightly convex whorls. The aperture is long and rather narrow, with a plicate tooth above.

Distribution
This species occurs in the following locations:
 European waters (ERMS scope) : demersal zone of the Mediterranean Sea

References

 Templado, J. and R. Villanueva 2010 Checklist of Phylum Mollusca. pp. 148–198 In Coll, M., et al., 2010. The biodiversity of the Mediterranean Sea: estimates, patterns, and threats. PLoS ONE 5(8):36pp

External links
 To Biodiversity Heritage Library (2 publications)
 To CLEMAM
 To Encyclopedia of Life
 To World Register of Marine Species

bulimulus
Gastropods described in 1874